Psyop may refer to:

Psychological operations
Psychological operations (United States)
Psi-Ops: The Mindgate Conspiracy, 2004 video game
Psyop (company), an advertising production company based in New York City